Ankerdine Hill is a hill with a summit at  above sea level, in the civil parish of Doddenham in the Malvern Hills district of Worcestershire, England.

References

Hills of Worcestershire